Riama yumborum is a species of lizard in the family Gymnophthalmidae. It is endemic to Ecuador.

References

Riama
Reptiles of Ecuador
Endemic fauna of Ecuador
Reptiles described in 2014
Taxa named by Vanessa Aguirre-Peñafiel
Taxa named by Omar Torres-Carvajal
Taxa named by Pedro M. Sales-Nunes
Taxa named by Mika R. Peck
Taxa named by Simon T. Maddock